Vindolanda was a Roman auxiliary fort (castrum) just south of Hadrian's Wall in northern England, which it pre-dated. Archaeological excavations of the site show it was under Roman occupation from roughly 85 AD to 370 AD. Located near the modern village of Bardon Mill in Northumberland, it guarded the Stanegate, the Roman road from the River Tyne to the Solway Firth. It is noted for the Vindolanda tablets, a set of wooden leaf-tablets that were, at the time of their discovery, the oldest surviving handwritten documents in Britain.

Early accounts
The first post-Roman record of the ruins at Vindolanda was made by the antiquarian William Camden, in his Britannia (1586).  Occasional travellers reached the site over the next two hundred years, and the accounts they left predate much of the stone-stealing that has damaged the site.  The military  (bath-house) was still partly roofed when Christopher Hunter visited the site in 1702. In about 1715 an excise officer named John Warburton found an altar there, which he removed.  In 1814 the first real archaeological work was begun, by the Rev. Anthony Hedley.

Hedley died in 1835, before writing up his discoveries.   Little more was done for a long time, although in 1914 a workman found another altar at the site, set up by the civilians living at the fort in honour of the Divine House and Vulcan.  Several names for the site are used in the early records, including "Chesters on Caudley", "Little Chesters", "The Bower" and "Chesterholm"; the altar found in 1914 confirmed that the Roman name for the site was "Vindolanda", which had been in dispute as one early source referred to it as "Vindolana".

Garrison
The garrison consisted of infantry or cavalry , not components of Roman legions. From the early third century, this was the Cohors IV Gallorum equitata also known as the Fourth Cohort of Gauls. It had been presumed that this title was, by this time, purely nominal, with auxiliary troops being recruited locally but an inscription found in a recent season of excavations suggests that native Gauls were still to be found in the regiment and that they liked to distinguish themselves from British soldiers. The inscription reads:

A translation of this is "The troops from Gaul dedicate this statue to the goddess Gallia with the full support of the British-born troops".

Among the troops were Basque-speaking soldiers of the Varduli.

Fort and village

Early wooden forts

The earliest Roman forts at Vindolanda were built of wood and turf. There are five timber forts, built (and demolished) one after the other. The first, a small fort, was probably built by the 1st Cohort of Tungrians about 85 AD. By about 95 AD this was replaced by a larger wooden fort built by the 9th Cohort of Batavians, a mixed infantry-cavalry unit of about 1,000 men. That fort was repaired in about 100 AD under the command of the Roman prefect Flavius Cerialis. When the 9th Cohort of Batavians left in 105 AD, their fort was demolished. The 1st Cohort of Tungrians returned to Vindolanda, built a larger wooden fort and remained here until Hadrian's Wall was built around 122 AD, when they moved, most likely to Vercovicium (Housesteads Roman Fort) on the wall, about two miles to the north-east of Vindolanda.

Stone forts, stone huts

Soon after Hadrian's Wall was built, most of its men were moved north to the Antonine Wall. A stone fort was built at Vindolanda, possibly for the 2nd Cohort of Nervians. From 208 to 211 AD, there was a major rebellion against Rome in Britain, and the Emperor Septimius Severus led an army to Britain to cope with it personally. The old stone fort was demolished, and replaced by an unconventional set of army buildings on the west, and an unusual array of many round stone huts where the old fort had been. Some of these circular huts are visible by the north and the southwest walls of the final stone fort. The Roman army may have built these to accommodate families of British farmers in this unsettled period. Septimius Severus died at York in 211 AD; his sons paid off the rebels and left for Rome. The stone buildings were demolished, and a large new stone fort was built where the huts had been, for the 4th Cohort of Gauls.

A , a self-governing village, developed to the west of the fort. The  contains several rows of buildings, each containing several one-room chambers. Most are not connected to the existing drainage system. The one that does was perhaps a butchery where, for health reasons, an efficient drain would have been important. The later stone fort, and the adjoining village, remained in use until about 285 AD, when it was largely abandoned for unknown reasons.

4th century forts

In about 370, the fort was roughly repaired, perhaps by irregular soldiers. There is no evidence for the traditional view that Roman occupation ended suddenly in 410; it may have declined slowly.

Excavation
In the 1930s, the house at Chesterholm where the museum is now located was purchased by archaeologist Eric Birley, who was interested in excavating the site.  The excavations have been continued by his sons, Robin and Anthony, and his grandson, Andrew Birley, into the present day. They are undertaken each summer, and some of the archaeological deposits reach depths of six metres. The anoxic conditions at these depths have preserved thousands of artefacts, such as 850 ink tablets and over 160 boxwood combs, that normally disintegrate in the ground, thus providing an opportunity to gain a fuller understanding of Roman life – military and otherwise – on the northern frontier. The study of these ink tablets shows a literacy among both the high born who there, as with the party invitation from one officer's wife to another and with soldiers and their families who send care packages with notes on the contents of the packages.  A study of spindle whorls from the north-western quadrant has indicated the presence of spinners of low- and high- status in the fort in the 3rd and 4th century AD. Along with ongoing excavations (in season) and excavated remains, a full-size replica of a section of Hadrian's Wall in both stone and turf can be seen on the site. As of yet there is no reconstruction of the Vallum.

Nearly 2000-year-old Roman boxing gloves were uncovered at Vindolanda in 2017 by the Vindolanda Trust experts led by Dr Andrew Birley. According to the Guardian, being similar in style and function to the full-hand modern boxing gloves, these two gloves found at Vindolanda look like leather bands and date back to 120 AD. It is suggested that, based on their difference from gladiator gloves, warriors using this type of gloves had no purpose to kill each other. These gloves were probably used in a sport for promoting fighting skills. The gloves are currently displayed at Vindolanda's museum. According to Birley, they are not part of a matching pair:
Recent excavations have been accompanied by new archaeological methodologies. 3-D imaging has been used to investigate the use of an ox cranium in target practice.

In 2021, a carved sandstone artifact was discovered a few inches below the floor of the fort. It depicts a nude warrior or deity before a horse or similar animal. Early interpretations point to the figure being of a Roman deity, perhaps of Mars or Mercury.

In 2023 February, a 2,000 year-old disembodied 6.3 inches long wooden phallus toy was revealed, according to the research published in the journal Antiquity.

Media attention 

In addition to the older initial findings of ink tablets, shoes and combs, several more artifacts and discoveries of note have been covered by the media. In 2017, the British newspaper The Guardian focused on a discovery of cavalry barracks that were uncovered during the excavation season that held a large number of artifacts including swords, ink tablets, textiles, arrowheads, and other military paraphernalia. Relative dating of the barracks had determined that they were built around 105 AD. The Guardian also publicized the discovery of a cache of 25 ink tablets found earlier in the 2017 season. The tablets were discovered in a trench in one of the earliest layers of the fort, dating to the 1st century AD. This discovery was considered to be the second-largest discovery of ink tablets in the world, with the first being a cache that was also discovered at Vindolanda in 1992.

In the 2014 excavation season, BBC ran a story about the discovery of one of the few surviving examples of a wooden toilet seat to be found in the Roman Empire. In the same year, they also recorded the discovery of the only (very old, very worn) gold coin ever to be found on the site with a mint date of 64 or 65 AD, lying in a site layer dating to the 4th century AD.

In 2010, the BBC announced the discovery of the remains of a child between the ages of 8 and 10 years, which was uncovered in a shallow pit in a barrack room in a position suggesting that its arms may have been bound. Further archaeological analysis indicated that it could be female. She is believed to have died about 1,800 years ago.

Another find publicised on the BBC website in 2006 was a bronze and silver fibula modelled with the figure of Mars, with the name Quintus Sollonius punched into its surface.

In 2020, archaeologists discovered a 5th-century chalice covered in religious iconography within a collapsed church structure. The images include crosses, angels, a smiling priestly figure holding a crook, fish, a whale, ships, the Greek letters chi-rho. In addition, the chalice bears scripts written in Latin, Greek, and possibly Ogham.

Site museum

The Vindolanda site museum, also known as Chesterholm Museum, conserves and displays finds from the site. The museum is set in gardens, which include full-sized reconstructions of a Roman temple, a Roman shop, a Roman house and Northumbrian croft, all with audio presentations. Exhibits include Roman boots, shoes, armour, jewellery and coins, infrared photographs of the writing tablets and, from 2011, a small selection of the tablets themselves, on loan from the British Museum. 2011 saw the reopening of the museum at Vindolanda, and also the Roman Army Museum at Magnae Carvetiorum (Carvoran), refurbished with a grant from the Heritage Lottery Fund.

Vindolanda Trust
In 1970, the Vindolanda Trust, a registered charity, was founded to administer the site and its museum, and in 1997, the Trust took over the running of the Roman Army Museum at Carvoran to the west, another Hadrian's Wall fort, which it had acquired in 1972.

See also
 Vindolanda tablets
 History of Northumberland
 Minimus, Latin textbooks for primary-school children, using stories based in Vindolanda

Notes

References

Bibliography
 Birley, R. Vindolanda: a Roman frontier post on Hadrian's Wall. Thames and Hudson, London, 1977.
 Birley, R. Vindolanda Guide: the home of Britain's finest treasures. Roman Army Museum Publications, Greenhead, 2012.

External links

 Vindolanda Trust
 BBC page on Vindolanda
 Directions and further details about Vindolanda and the remaining sections of Hadrian's Wall 
 Hadrian's Wall Discussion Forum
 3-D survey of Vindolana

Archaeological sites in Northumberland
History of Northumberland
Forts of Hadrian's Wall
Former populated places in Northumberland
Museums in Northumberland
Museums of ancient Rome in the United Kingdom
Archaeological museums in England
Roman auxiliary forts in England